Banksia Grove is a suburb of Perth, Western Australia, located within the City of Wanneroo. Its postcode is 6031, and it was until the late 1990s part of Neerabup. The suburb is approximately 27 km NE of the Perth central business district, 8 km east of the coast and 5 km ENE of Joondalup.

Suburban development

In 2005, the Banksia Grove Joint Venture partnership was established to revive and develop the suburb. The $2 billion project will create a further 3500 home sites to complement the existing 650 developed prior to 2005. In total an estimated 12,000 residents will call Banksia Grove home by the project's completion in 2020. The new community contains a diverse range of housing types to suit residents in differing life stages and backgrounds.
Housing in the new section has fibre to the premises as standard, provided by NBN Co as an estate network, and resold by providers, which also transmits commercial television. Recently the more established section received and is continuing to receive further rollout of the National Broadband Network, as is some sections of the new area.

Major facilities for the area include:
 The Banksia Grove District Shopping Centre, of which Stages 1 & 2 are completed 
 An education precinct including the new Joseph Banks Secondary College, shared playing fields and a planned primary school
 A 42 hectare Bush Forever zone with native retained bushland
 Over 30 hectares of parkland including Discovery Park, which contains a living stream water feature, amphitheatre and Pitstop Park adventure playground

In late 2018, development of a parcel of land began that is in close proximity to the shopping precinct. Named "Coda", it primarily consists of high density narrow lots, with two story homes. Sales of all lots and builds of individual homes is expected to be completed by the end of 2019.

Demographics
Banksia Grove had a population of 9,350 at the 2016 census, 1,940 at the 2006 census, and 1,136 at the 2001 census.

Facilities
Banksia Grove Village was the first stage of the Banksia Grove District Shopping Centre. When completed it contained a Coles Supermarket, service station, several fast food outlets, a cafe and other small retail outlets. Woolworths and Aldi supermarkets are also now trading with several other outlets including chemist, hairdresser, fast food and a proposed coffee shop will be open mid-2018.  a car wash facility has also commenced trading. Autobahn have also confirmed they will be opening for business in the near future. Even though Banksia Grove is only a ten-minute drive to the coast it is not considered a coastal suburb by Western Australian standards.

Education
The suburb currently has three primary schools and one high school:
 Banksia Grove Primary School - formally Neerabup Primary School) (government)
 St John Paul II Catholic Primary School (formally Banksia Grove Catholic Primary School) (private)
 Grandis Primary School (government)
 Joseph Banks Secondary College (government)

Leisure
"Spring in the Grove" is an annual community festival held on the first Sunday in November every year. The event is supported by the City of Wanneroo and the Banksia Grove Partnerships. It is organised and run by volunteers, and staged at various venues. In previous years it has been held at Discovery Park and the Joseph Banks Secondary College grounds.

Discovery Park has a man-made stream meandering through ponds with sunny and shaded grassed areas, covered picnic tables and free electric barbecues. Because the waterway system is isolated from natural water, it is able to be stocked with a large amount of colourful koi. It also has an open-air amphitheatre.
Adjoining this is Pitstop Playground, which has a training cycleway for children, and play equipment.

A skatepark was opened in 2019 on the corner of Grandis Boulevard and Pinjar Road.

Transport
The suburb is served by bus routes which provide connections to the Joondalup railway line via the Joondalup railway station.
 390 Joondalup Station - Banksia Grove. Operates along Joondalup Drive and Grandis Boulevard to a terminus on Forever Boulevard in the eastern part of the suburb. Selected services deviate via Joseph Banks Secondary College, Banksia Grove Primary School, or along Viridian Drive, which was an old alignment of the route.
 391 Joondalup Station - Banksia Grove. Operates along Ghost Gum Boulevard to a terminus on Glasshouse Drive in the western part of the suburb. Services the Banksia Grove Shopping Centres. Selected services deviate via Joseph Banks Secondary College.

Social issues
In 2010-2011 Banksia Grove had 396 offences. Despite growing in population nine-fold over the last 7 years, a concerted effort by local police has kept this to 442 (2018-2019), decreasing the ratio per 100 residents, and the suburb is maturing as a social place to live. Police response times are better than most outer suburbs, having the academy, along with Joondalup and Wanneroo Police stations within close transit. In late 2018 a neighbourhood watch was established. A visibly higher police presence is also attributable to the Joondalup Police Academy using Joondalup Drive quite frequently to travel to Bullsbrook, where they engage in training in police pursuits, off-road capabilities and other driver skills required by their industry. Community members are able to become part of two established Facebook groups and several buy/sell and a type of "pay it forward" group.

References

External links 
 Banksia Grove Suburb Profile from Link House and Land.
 Facebook group for the Banksia Grove Residents Association.
 The new Coda development close to the shopping precinct.
 St John Paul Catholic Primary School.
 Banksia Grove Primary School.
 Grandis Primary School.
 Joseph Banks Secondary College.

Suburbs of Perth, Western Australia
Suburbs of the City of Wanneroo